Wolfgang Leu (born 8 February 1945) is an Austrian modern pentathlete. He competed at the 1968 and 1972 Summer Olympics.

References

1945 births
Living people
Austrian male modern pentathletes
Olympic modern pentathletes of Austria
Modern pentathletes at the 1968 Summer Olympics
Modern pentathletes at the 1972 Summer Olympics
Sportspeople from Vienna